Dwarf snapdragon is a common name for several plants and may refer to:

 Antirrhinum majus
 
 Chaenorhinum minus, native to Europe